The Five Towns Stadium also known as Axiom is a future rugby league stadium in Glasshoughton, Castleford, West Yorkshire, England. The stadium is intended to have a capacity of 13,300 spectators, it will replace Wheldon Road which has been home to Castleford Tigers since 1926.

Background
It is possible the ground might initially be shared with Wakefield Trinity as they were denied planning permission for their Newmarket Stadium plans.
The project was given the go ahead in 2007, and is expected to cost around £15 million and will be part of a £40 million development.

Work was expected to start on the new ground in late 2008, just off junction 32 of the M62.
On 22 May 2009, the completion of a detailed draft design including details of the facilities to be included in the new ground and a building schedule was unveiled. The new stadium has been designed by Leeds- and London-based architect practice 'Ramsden and Partners'. Unfortunately no money could be found to fund the project and it was abandoned although Castleford expressed their desire to move to a new stadium.
 
Planning permission was granted in early 2011 and the club aimed to move into the stadium for the 2013 Super League season  however sponsorship money became unavailable and the stadium had to be put on hold.

In 2015 it was announced that there would be a stadium built at Glasshoughton as part of a new retail park called the Five Towns Park which would be on the same site as the stadium with work expected to start early 2016 and with a view of Castleford Tigers moving in by the 2019 season.

In late 2018 it was announced the new stadium was to be part of the new Axiom shopping complex.

References

New Stadium information on Castleford RLFC website

Castleford Tigers
Rugby league stadiums in England
Proposed stadiums in the United Kingdom
Proposed buildings and structures in England